"Will You Marry Me?" is a song by American artist Paula Abdul, released as the fifth and final single from her 1991 album, Spellbound. The song was written by Abdul, Peter Lord, Sandra St. Victor and V. Jeffrey Smith.

Song information
The ballad was released right as Abdul became engaged and married to Emilio Estevez. They married in California on April 29, 1992, but then divorced two years later in May 1994.

Stevie Wonder made a special guest appearance on the track playing the harmonica.

The single's B-side was a track from the Spellbound sessions called "Good Night, My Love (Pleasant Dreams)"; it was recorded for a compilation as well, called For Our Children, whose proceeds benefited the Pediatric AIDS Foundation.

Like the previous single "Vibeology", the single reached the top 20 on the Billboard Hot 100 (peaking at number 19), becoming a modest hit for Abdul.

The music video for the song featured a digital composite of five versions of Abdul wearing similarly coloured white outfits. Each "version" of Abdul performs a different style of dance to the song (ballet, jazz etc...) and ultimately settle into a choreographed routine in which they dance with one another, concluding with one Abdul dancing with and being carried off by a translucent partner.

Track listings
US cassette
 "Will You Marry Me?" (album version) (Peter Lord; Sandra St. Victor; V. Jeffrey Smith, Paula Abdul)
 "Good Night, My Love (Pleasant Dreams)" (George Motola; (John Marascalco)

UK CD
 "Will You Marry Me?" (edit)
 "The Promise of a New Day" (East Coast remix) (Peter Lord; V. Jeffrey Smith)
 "Good Night, My Love (Pleasant Dreams)" (George Motola; John Marascalco)
 "Will You Marry Me?" (album version) (Peter Lord; Sandra St. Victor; V. Jeffrey Smith, Paula Abdul)

Charts

Release history

References

1991 songs
1992 singles
Paula Abdul songs
Songs written by Paula Abdul
Songs written by Sandra St. Victor
Virgin Records singles